Little Misunderstandings of No Importance is a 1985 short story collection by the Italian writer Antonio Tabucchi.

Reception
Brian Stonehill reviewed the book for the Los Angeles Times, and identified Tabucchi as a "neo-classical" writer, a label he also put on fellow Italians Primo Levi and Italo Calvino. Stonehill compared the book's balance between the serious and ironic to the works of Thomas Pynchon, and wrote: "Tabucchi reaps a bonus from the bogus; he dramatizes, convincingly, the limitations of imitation itself."

See also
 1985 in literature
 Italian literature

References

1985 short story collections
Italian short story collections
Works by Antonio Tabucchi